Isoxanthohumol is a prenylflavonoid, and it is a phytoestrogen. It is abbreviated as IX or IXN.

8-Prenylnaringenin can be produced from isoxanthohumol by flora in the human intestine, and by fungi in cell cultures.

This prenylflavonoid is found in hops and beer. It has limited estrogenic activity. At the concentration found in beer, it is unlikely to have an estrogenic effect in breast tissue.

Derivatives of isoxanthohumol are: 7,4′-Di-O-methylisoxanthohumol; 7-O-methylisoxanthohumol; 7-O-n-pentylisoxanthohumol; 7,4′-di-O-n-pentyl-8-isoxanthohumol; 7,4′-Di-O-allylisoxanthohumol; 7,4′-Di-O-acetylisoxanthohumol; and 7,4′-Di-O-palmitoylisoxanthohumol.

See also 
 Xanthohumol, the corresponding prenylated chalcone

References 

Flavanones
O-methylated natural phenols
Prenylflavonoids
Humulus